Royal Persian Paintings: The Qajar Epoch 1785-1925 was the first major exhibition of Persian art in Qajar era which took place from October 1998 to June 1999 at Brooklyn Museum in New York. The curator of the exhibition was Layla S. Diba, Hagop Kevorkian Curator of Islamic Art at the Brooklyn Museum, a scholar of Persian art in the 18th and 19th century, assisted by Maryam Ekhtiar, Research Associate at Brooklyn Museum.

The exhibition later took place at UCLA/Hammer Museum in Los Angeles from Feb 24 - May 9, 1999, and SOAS in London from July 6 - Sep 30, 1999.

The catalogue of the exhibition including more than 200 images of the paintings and scholarly articles, edited by Layla S. Diba and Maryam Ekhtiar, was published later by I. B. Tauris in London.

New York Times' Holland Cotter wrote about the exhibition: "An assertive, self-promotional dynastic art of almost hallucinatory strangeness and brilliance."

See also
 Persian art
 Qajar art

References

External links 
Royal Persian Paintings: The Qajar Epoch 1783-1925 by Layla Soudavar Diba, Maryam Ekhtiar (Book Review by Sheila S. Blair)

Iranian art
Qajar Iran
Art exhibitions in the United States
1998 in New York City
1999 in New York City
Brooklyn Museum